Nigel Morritt Wace (10 January 1929 India – 4 February 2005 Canberra, Australia) was an authority on the plant life of the four Tristan da Cunha Islands, islands he first visited in 1955 when he visited Gough Island. He was educated at Brambletye School, then Sheikh Bagh Preparatory School in Kashmir, then school in Cheltenham, followed by a period as a commissioned officer in the Royal Marines form where he was invalided out in 1947, progressing to Brasenose College, Oxford.

At Brasenose Wace read Agricultural Economics, switching to Botany. His later work on Tristan da Cunha led to his PhD thesis on the vegetation of Gough Island, received from Queen's University, Belfast.

Wace's periods in Tristan da Cunha started with his membership as botanist of the Gough Island Scientific Survey from 1955–56.

In Australia Wace made a substantial contribution to knowledge of the Australian flora, both in settled parts and in the outback.

Wace married Margaret White with whom he had a son and two daughters. Wace's family claims descent from Wace, the 12th-century Jerseyman and chronicler of the House of Normandy.

He was employed by  the Geography department of Adelaide University, moving later to the Australian National University at Canberra where he was initially a lecturer subsequently head of the university's department of Biogeography and Geomorphology.

Publications

References

People educated at Brambletye School
1929 births
2005 deaths
Alumni of Brasenose College, Oxford
Royal Marines officers
Botanists active in Australia
Alumni of Queen's University Belfast
British emigrants to Australia